Palaeocentrotus is an extinct genus of Lampridiformes.

External links
 Palaeocentrotus at the Paleobiology Database

Lampriformes